Vienna City Hall (German: Wiener Rathaus) is the seat of local government of Vienna, located on Rathausplatz in the Innere Stadt district. Constructed from 1872 to 1883 in a Neo-Gothic style according to plans designed by Friedrich von Schmidt, it houses the office of the Mayor of Vienna as well as the chambers of the city council and Vienna Landtag diet. For a brief period between 1892 and 1894, the Vienna City Hall was the world's tallest building, until it was eclipsed by Milwaukee City Hall.

History

By the mid 19th century, the offices in the old Vienna town hall, dedicated by the Austrian duke Frederick the Fair in 1316 and rebuilt by the Baroque architect Johann Bernhard Fischer von Erlach around 1700, had become too small. When the lavish Ringstraße was laid out in the 1860s, a competition to build a new city hall was initiated, won by the German architect Friedrich Schmidt.

Mayor Cajetan Felder urged for the location on the boulevard where simultaneously numerous representative buildings were erected, such as the Vienna State Opera, the Austrian Parliament Building, the main building of the Vienna University, or the Burgtheater. Construction costs amounted to a total of about 14 million florins, borne by both the City of Vienna and the Imperial-Royal (k.k.) government after lengthy debate.

Big Build

The design of the richly adorned facade is modelled on the Gothic architecture of Flemish and Brabant secular buildings like the Brussels Town Hall. On 21 October 1882, the Rathausmann statue was installed on the top, which soon became one of the symbols of Vienna. It is largely built with bricks decorated with limestone, mainly from the Leitha Mountains, and ashlar masonry.

The Rathaus also accommodates the historic 'Wiener Rathauskeller' restaurant. The traditional restaurant consists of several baroque halls, offering small traditional Viennese delicacies to grand gala buffets.

Facing the city hall is the large Rathauspark.

Structure 
The Vienna City Hall has the following structure from top to bottom:

 Main Tower (Rathausmann)
 Attic Storey
 2nd Floor
 1st Floor
 Half-Floor
 Ground Floor
 1st Basement
 2nd Basement

Main Tower 
Atop the steeple of the 98-meter high tower, stands the 3.4-meter tall Rathausmann; an iron standard bearer. It was designed by Alexander Nehr, and donated by master locksmith and factory owner Ludwig Wilhelm.

The statue was attached to the spire on 21 October 1932.

1st Floor 
The ballroom can be found on the first floor at the front of the hall, with views of the ring road, Burgtheater, and inner city. The 1st floor ballroom is 71 meters long and spans a width of 20 meters. The ballroom runs adjacent to the banqueting hall, also adjoining with the north buffet and armorial hall.

The Municipal Council Meeting Room and Municipal Senate Meeting Room are both also part of the first floor.

Ground Floor 
There are numerous entry points into the Vienna City Hall via the ground floor. There are entrances to the north, south, and west.

The Volkshalle, or "People's Hall", is located on the ground floor, right below the first floor ballroom. The Volkshalle is used nowadays to host events.

Additionally, since 1927, the town hall guard, a special unit of the Viennese professional fire brigade, has resided in the ground floor of the town hall for security. Their duties include standard fire response duties and disaster control.

1st Basement 
The first basement, also called the Vienna City Hall cellar, was first opened on 12 February 1899. The artistic design was overseen by Josef Urban, and the historical murals by Heinrich Lefler. The first basement contains numerous rooms including the Knights' Hall, the Green Hall, and the Grinzinger Keller.

There were extensive renovations performed in 1925, 1952, and 2005, where historical murals and woodwork were fully refurbished.

Renovation work
On September 27, 2012, renovation work  started on what is expected to be a 35 million euro project to renovate the building by the year 2023 when the work – expected to take place in 11 stages and affecting 40,000 m2 – will be complete. Recently finished renovations (2000) include the grand re-opening of the neo-baroque Salon Ziehrer and the redesigned Lanner-Lehar Hall with wall and ceiling murals by German Trompe-l'œil artist Rainer Maria Latzke.

Gallery

References

External links

 Official Homepage of the Vienna City Hall
 Das Wiener Rathaus – Der Neubau 1868
 Bundesdenkmalamt – Rathaus Wien
 The Vienna parks – Rathauspark
 Website of the Viennese city government

Rathaus
Rathaus
City and town halls in Austria
Government buildings completed in 1883
1883 establishments in Austria
19th-century architecture in Austria